PA23 may refer to:
Pennsylvania's 23rd congressional district
Pennsylvania Route 23
Piper Aztec light aircraft